Amos Binney (October 18, 1803 – February 18, 1847) was an American physician and malacologist.

Biography
His son was William G. Binney.

He was a co-founder of Boston Society of Natural History in 1830 and he was a member of the society until his death in 1847. He was also a president of the society from May 17, 1843, to May 5, 1847.

Bibliography 
 (1851-1855). The terrestrial air-breathing mollusks of the United States, and the adjacent territories of North America.
 Volume 1 - edited by Augustus Addison Gould
 Volume 2
 Volume 3
 Volume 4

References

External links 
 
 photo of memorial of Amos Binney in Mount Auburn Cemetery in Massachusetts

1803 births
1847 deaths
People from Boston
American malacologists
19th-century American physicians
Harvard College alumni
Brown University alumni